David Amiel (born 28 November 1992) is a French politician who has served in the National Assembly since the 2022 French legislative election.

Biography 
David Amiel was born in Paris on 28 November 1992, completed his secondary studies at Lycée Louis-le-Grand. After completing his Baccalauréat, Amiel returned to school, studying at Lycée Henri-IV, where he achieved his hypokhâgne.  Amiel graduated from the École normale supérieure in 2011 and later studied at Princeton University, in the United States.,

In 2015, Amiel worked as an intern in the office of then-Minister of Finance Emmanuel Macron.

Between May 2017 and March 2019, David Amiel was one of President Macron's advisors in the Élysée Palace alongside Alexis Kohler, the President's Secretary-General. Amiel was responsible for coordination between technical advisors in the President's office. Amiel left the President's office to co-write an essay Le progrès ne tombe pas du ciel (English: Progress doesn't fall from the sky) with Ismaël Emelien. The two wrote about the "society of frustration", and the "secession of the popular classes" and that progressivism is the only political response to populism. According to sources close to Macron, the work was meant to serve as an "ideological backbone" to Macronism. The work, which sold 3700 copies, was received dryly by critics who suggested that it was low on substance in favor of absolute support of the President's actions.,.

In 2019, Amiel joined the team of Benjamin Griveaux in preparation for the 2020 Paris municipal elections. After the defeat of the Presidential majority in the city, Amiel sat as a member of the opposition in the city council, representing the 15th arrondissement. Amiel opposed the Tour Triangle, campaigned in support of the opening of Rue du Commerce on Sundays and worked on security problems in Beaugrenelle.

At the same time, Amiel began work at La Poste, but left the job after less than a year to join President Macron's re-election campaign in the 2022 presidential election.

During the 2022 legislative elections, Amiel ran as a candidate in Paris's 13th constituency as a member of the Ensemble ! coalition. A vote leader in the first round, Amiel was elected in the second round over Aminata Niakaté of the NUPES coalition with 59.86% of the vote. Upon his election to parliament, Amiel became a member of the Finance committee in the National Assembly.

Publications 
Avec Ismaël Emelien, Le progrès ne tombe pas du ciel, Paris, Fayard, 2019 .

References 

1992 births
Living people
Members of Parliament for Paris
Deputies of the 16th National Assembly of the French Fifth Republic
Lycée Louis-le-Grand alumni
Lycée Henri-IV alumni
École Normale Supérieure alumni
Princeton University alumni
La République En Marche! politicians